CHG Healthcare is an American healthcare services company that was founded in 1979 by Therus C. Kolff to deliver medical care to rural areas of the western United States. The company is based in Midvale, Utah, though the postal designation of nearby Salt Lake City is used in its mailing address.

CHG Healthcare was originally known as CompHealth, and now includes a collection of healthcare-related companies such as CompHealth, Weatherby Healthcare, RNnetwork, Foundation Medical Staffing, Global Medical Staffing (purchased in 2016), and Modio Health (purchased in 2019) .The CHG family of companies is one of the largest providers of healthcare staffing in the United States, with 31% market share in locum tenens revenue. Their services also include both temporary and permanent placement of physicians, nurses and allied health professionals.

CHG employs over 3,000 people in 11 offices located around the United States, doing business in all 50 states. In 2018, the company was listed at #2 on the Salt Lake Tribune's "Top Work Places" for large businesses. Up until 2022, the company was consistently named as one of Fortune magazine's "100 Best Companies to Work For".

References 

Companies based in Salt Lake County, Utah
Health care companies established in 1979
Health care companies based in Utah
1979 establishments in Utah
Medical outsourcing companies of the United States